The Partners: Inside America's Most Powerful Law Firms (1983) is a bestselling book by James B. Stewart. The book is a product of two years of investigation of the role of prominent law firms in society. The book describes and discusses several famous cases. There have been five editions of the book as of 2008.

Contents
 Part One. Iran — Shearman & Sterling, Davis Polk & Wardwell
 Part Two. IBM — Cravath, Swaine & Moore
 Part Three. Genentech — Pillsbury, Madison & Sutro
 Part Four. Westinghouse — Kirkland & Ellis
 Part Five. Chrysler — Debevoise, Plimpton, Lyons & Gates
 Part Six. Kennecott — Sullivan & Cromwell
 Part Seven. Rockefeller — Milbank, Tweed, Hadley & McCloy
 Part Eight. Kodak — Donovan, Leisure, Newton & Irvine

Official information

References

External links
Author, Editor-at-Large & Columnist, Smart Money
UCLA — James B. Stewart
www.librarything.com

1983 non-fiction books
Business books
Law books
Simon & Schuster books
Books by James B. Stewart